The 1987 Motorcraft Formula Ford Driver to Europe Series was an Australian motor racing competition open to Formula Ford racing cars. It was the 18th Australian Formula Ford Series.

The series was won by Peter Verheyen driving a Van Diemen RF86.

Calendar

The series was contested over nine rounds with one race per round.

Series standings

 The 1600cc Ford "Kent" engine was mandatory for all cars.

Notes and references

Motorcraft Formula Ford Driver to Europe Series
Australian Formula Ford Series